Moridabad (also Romanized as Morīdābād) is a village in Robat Rural District, in the Central District of Khorramabad County, Lorestan Province, Iran. At the 2006 census, its population was 96, in 22 families.

References 

Towns and villages in Khorramabad County